Culteranismo is a stylistic movement of the Baroque period of Spanish history that is also commonly referred to as Gongorismo (after Luis de Góngora). It began in the late 16th century with the writing of Luis de Góngora and lasted through the 17th century.

Culteranismo is characterized by an ornamental, ostentatious vocabulary and a message that is complicated by a heavy use of metaphors and complex syntactical order.
The name blends culto ("cultivated") and luteranismo ("Lutheranism") and was coined by its opponents to present it as a heresy of "true" poetry.

Poetry from this movement seems to use as many words as possible to convey little meaning or to conceal meaning. It is also associated with Latinized syntax and mythological allusions.

Culteranismo existed in stark contrast with conceptismo, another movement of the Baroque period which is characterized by a witty style, word games, simple vocabulary, and an attempt to convey multiple meanings in as few words as possible. The best-known representative of Spanish conceptismo, Francisco de Quevedo, had an ongoing feud with Luis de Góngora in which each criticized the other’s writing and personal life.

Other practitioners of the style include Hortensio Félix Paravicino.

Sample

The first stanza of the first of the Soledades by Góngora.

See also
Hiberno-Latin, a style of Latin poetry by Irish monks, with a similarly contrived vocabulary.
Euphuism, a similar style in English prose.
Préciosisme, a similar style in French high society.
Marinismo, a similar style in Italian poetry.

References

External links
El culteranismo, an essay on culteranismo by Jorge Luis Borges, in Spanish.

Spanish literature
Baroque literature
Spanish Baroque

de:Schwulststil#Gongorismus und Kultismus im spanischen Siglo de Oro